Kiprovo is the name of several rural localities in Russia:
Kiprovo, Arkhangelsk Oblast, a village in Pavlovsky Selsoviet of Kargopolsky District of Arkhangelsk Oblast
Kiprovo, Novgorod Oblast, a village in Tregubovskoye Settlement of Chudovsky District of Novgorod Oblast
Kiprovo, Pskov Oblast, a village in Dnovsky District of Pskov Oblast